Bryan Kearsley is a British philatelist who, in 2006, was awarded the Crawford Medal by the Royal Philatelic Society London for his work Discovering Seahorses – King George V high values. Kearlsey is an expert on the King George V Seahorse stamps of the United Kingdom.

Selected publications
Discovering Seahorses – King George V high values. Great Britain Philatelic Society, 2005.

References

External links
GBPS: Discovering Seahorses, Bryan Kearsley.

Year of birth missing (living people)
Fellows of the Royal Philatelic Society London
Living people
Kearsley